Waco is a 1952 American Western film directed by Lewis D. Collins and starring Wild Bill Elliott, I. Stanford Jolley and Pamela Blake.

The film's sets were designed by the art director Martin Obzina. It was shot at the Iverson Ranch.

Plot
The inhabitants of Waco in Texas employ a gunfighter to clean up the town.

Cast
Wild Bill Elliott as Matt Boone
I. Stanford Jolley as Curly Ivers
Pamela Blake as Kathy Clark
Paul Fierro as Lou Garcia
Rand Brooks as Al - henchman
Richard Avonde as Pedro - henchman
Pierce Lyden as Farley
Lane Bradford as Wallace
Terry Frost as Will Richards
Stanley Price as Sheriff of Waco
Stanley Andrews as judge
Michael Whalen as Barnes - banker
Ray Bennett as Bull Clark
Rory Mallinson as Crawford
Dick Paxton as Ace Logan
Russ Whiteman as Sheriff of Pecos
House Peters Jr. as doctor

References

Bibliography

External links

1952 Western (genre) films
American Western (genre) films
Films directed by Lewis D. Collins
Monogram Pictures films
American black-and-white films
Films set in Texas
Films scored by Raoul Kraushaar
1950s English-language films
1950s American films